Welcome to Strangeland is the twelfth studio album, and the fourth in the "Collabos" series, by rapper Tech N9ne. It was released on November 8, 2011, the rapper's 40th birthday.

Background 
In April 2011, Tech N9ne spoke about the album in an interview with 411mania.com. In the interview he said that the album would strictly feature everyone on the Strange Music label, only expanding to closely affiliated artists such as Irv Da Phenom and Ces Cru. Then in August 2011, Tech announced through Twitter that he was about to begin work on Strangeland and that producers would include Seven, Jomeezius The Genius, David Sanders II and ¡Mayday!. He also said that the album would most likely feature 18 tracks.

On August 11, 2011, Tech N9ne posted an image on Twitter revealing a track called "Kocky" and featuring Kutt Calhoun and Jay Rock. On August 31, 2011, it was confirmed through a blog post that the album would be titled "Welcome to Strangeland" and that the release date was scheduled for November 8, 2011.

It was also confirmed that there would be a collaboration between Tech and Prozak, who is a current member of Strange Music and collaborated with Tech on 2009's K.O.D.

The album was made available for pre-order from Strange Music's online store on September 9, 2011. The cover was revealed with the pre-order. When pre-ordered, the album came with a download of "Beautiful Music." It also confirmed several features on the album including Stevie Stone, ¡Mayday!, Brotha Lynch Hung, Young Bleed, Krizz Kaliko and Kutt Calhoun.

On September 14, 2011, Tech mentioned on Twitter a collaboration between Prozak and Brotha Lynch Hung on a track called "My Favorite" as well as a song with Young Bleed titled "Come Dirty". He also confirmed earlier in the day that he had completed recording music for the album.

In an interview with Jomeezius The Genius, he confirmed that he produced a total of 6 tracks for the album and that 4 of them will definitely be on it.

On October 13, Tech released the song "The Noose" featuring ¡Mayday!. Then on October 24, he released the song "Unfair". A Behind the Scenes film was also released on October 24 for the music video "Who Do I Catch." Several days later, Tech premiered the track "Slave."

The first music video for the album, "Who Do I Catch" which was directed by Dan Gedman of Liquid 9, premiered on XXLMag.com on November 5, 2011.

A deluxe edition of the album was made available from Best Buy that contained 3 bonus tracks ("I Need A Drink", "The Real Thing" and "EMJ") and a new Strangeland pendant.  A deluxe edition was also made available through iTunes which contained the three bonus tracks available from Best Buy, and an additional bonus track ("Road Rage").

Commercial Performance
The album debuted at number 21 on the Billboard 200 with 26,000 copies sold in its first week.

Track listing 
Confirmed by HipHopDX

References 

2011 albums
Concept albums
Tech N9ne albums
Albums produced by Seven (record producer)
Strange Music albums